Ralph Archibald Legall (1 December 1925 – 2003) was a West Indian cricketer who played in four Tests in 1953.

Legall played as a wicket-keeper and middle-order batsman for Trinidad from 1946-47 to 1957-58. His highest score was 68, the top score in Trinidad's first innings of their victory over Jamaica in 1954-55. He replaced Alfred Binns as the West Indies wicket-keeper after the First Test against India in 1952-53 and played the last four Tests of the series.

In 1960 he played for Church in the Lancashire League. He then went to Canada.

Legall also played Davis Cup tennis: for the British Caribbean team against the USA and Canada in 1954 and 1956. He is one of only two people to play both Test cricket and Davis Cup tennis. The other is Cotah Ramaswami of India. By a coincidence, Ramaswami managed the Indian team against which Legall played his Test matches.

There is mystery surrounding Legall's death: he is variously reported to have died in Toronto, New York state or Trinidad, and probably in February 2003.

References

External links
 Ralph Legall at Cricinfo
 Ralph Legall at CricketArchive

1925 births
2003 deaths
West Indies Test cricketers
People from Saint Michael, Barbados
Barbadian cricketers
Barbadian male tennis players
Trinidad and Tobago cricketers
Barbados cricketers
Wicket-keepers